DDT Sweet Dreams! 2023 was a professional wrestling event promoted by CyberFight's sub-brand DDT Pro-Wrestling (DDT). It took place on January 29, 2023, in Tokyo, Japan, at the Korakuen Hall. The event aired on CyberAgent's AbemaTV online linear television service and CyberFight's streaming service Wrestle Universe.

Storylines
The event featured nine professional wrestling matches that resulted from scripted storylines, where wrestlers portrayed villains, heroes, or less distinguishable characters in the scripted events that built tension and culminated in a wrestling match or series of matches.

Event
The preshow portraited a comedic No fee rumble match featuring cosplayers of various popular wrestlers from other consacrated promotions such as Drew McIntyre, Luke Gallows, Great-O-Khan, Asuka or Tiger Mask. It was won by Fuminori Abe who last eliminated Sanshiro Takagi. The first match of the main card saw Kanon and MJ Paul picking up a victory over the teams of Disasterbox (Kazuki Hirata and Toru Owashi), Akito and Antonio Honda, and Yuki Ishida and Yuya Koroku in four-way tag team action. Next, Hideki Okatani defeated Kazuma Sumi and Keigo Nakamura defeated Takeshi Masada in the first ever edition of the D Generations Cup, the successor of the former and folded Young Drama Cup. Next, The37Kamiina (Toui Kojima and Yuki Ueno) and Shinya Aoki defeated Hikaru Machida, Thanomsak Toba and Yukio Sakaguchi in six-man tag team action. Another six-action saw Chris Brookes, Harashima and Yukio Naya defeating Jun Akiyama, DDT Universal Champion Naruki Doi and Soma Takao. On the seventh bout of the event, Tetsuya Endo, Kotaro Suzuki and Yusuke Okada marked their first successful defense of the KO-D 6-Man Tag Team Championship against Pheromones (Danshoku Dino, Koju Takeda and Yuki Iino). In the semi main event, Mao and Shunma Katsumata secured their first defense of the KO-D Tag Team Championship against Makoto Oishi and Shiori Asahi.

In the main event, Yuji Hino defeated Kazusada Higuchi to win the KO-D Openweight Championship for the second time in his career, ending the latter's reign at 210 days.

Results

Notes

References

External links
The official DDT Pro-Wrestling website

DDT Pro-Wrestling shows
CyberAgent
2023 in professional wrestling
January 2023 events in Japan
Professional wrestling in Tokyo